Zhang Bichen (born September 10, 1989), also known as Diamond Zhang, is a Chinese singer. She was a member of the South Korean girl group Sunny Days. In 2014, she won the Chinese singing contest The Voice of China.

Early life
Zhang was born in Tianjin, China on September 10, 1989.

Career

2009–2013: Sunny Days

In 2013, Zhang became a trainee in South Korean management company Haeun Entertainment. In the same year, she debuted her singing career by becoming a member of South Korean girl group Sunny Days. In 2013, she won the championship of K-Pop World Festival in China. In 2014, she left the group.

2014–present: Morning Bound for Midnight 
In 2014, Zhang competed in season 3 of the Chinese singing talent show The Voice of China, and was the winner where she covered the Chinese singer Reno Wang's song "Where Is the Time Gone?" in the final round. In the same year, she sang the interlude song titled "In the Span of a Kiss" for the Chinese television drama The Young Doctor. In 2015, she sang the interlude song titled "Annual Ring" for the Chinese television drama The Journey of Flower. In the same year, she appeared on the Chinese reality show Be the Idol. In 2016, she appeared on the Chinese reality show Mask Singer. In the same year, she held her first solo concert, and released her debut solo studio album, Morning Bound for Midnight. In March 2017, she appeared on the Chinese singing competition Singer.

Singer 2017 
In March 2017, Zhang took part in Singer 2017, the fifth season of Hunan Television's long-running series I Am a Singer which series were renamed to Singer on the same year. She entered the competition as the third challenger; she was originally eliminated in her debut week per the challenge rules (which required her to finish in the top four, where Zhang finished last), but eliminations were canceled after one contestant (Tan Jing) withdrew from the competition. Despite her elimination in the following week (for finishing last in both weeks), she eventually made it to the finals after qualifying in the Breakouts, where she finished sixth.

Personal life 
On 22 January 2021, Zhang announced on her social media account that she had given birth to a girl in 2019, whose father is Chinese singer Hua Chenyu. Hua also published posts acknowledging this.

Discography
 Morning Bound for Midnight (2016)
 Time (2021)

Soundtracks

References

External links
 
 

1989 births
Singers from Tianjin
Living people
The Voice (franchise) winners
The Voice of China contestants
21st-century Chinese women singers